Lawrence Williams or Laurence Williams may refer to:

Lawrence G. Williams (1913–1975), American politician
Lawrence P. Williams (1905–1996), British motion picture art director
Lawrence Williams (American football), American football player, see 1976 NFL expansion draft
Lawrence Williams (baseball) (born 1933), American Negro league baseball player
Lawrence Williams (cricketer) (born 1946), Welsh former cricketer
Lawrence Williams (writer), co-writer of The Monster Maker
L. F. Rushbrook Williams (Laurence Frederic Rushbrook Williams, 1890–1978), British historian and civil servant
Laurence Williams (nuclear engineer) (born 1946), British nuclear power safety expert and academic
Lawrence Williams (banker) (c. 1955–2014), Guyanese banking official

See also
Larry Williams (disambiguation)
Laurie Williams (disambiguation)